On November 4, 2014, the District of Columbia held a U.S. House of Representatives election for its shadow representative. Unlike its non-voting delegate, the shadow representative is only recognized by the district and is not officially sworn or seated. Incumbent Shadow Representative Nate Bennett-Fleming did not run for reelection and Franklin Garcia was elected in his place. The election was held concurrently with a mayoral election.

Primary elections
Primary elections were held on April 1, 2014.

Democratic primary

Candidates
 Franklin Garcia, community activist

Results

Libertarian primary

Candidates
 Martin Moulton, school choice activist

Results

Other primaries
The Republican and Statehood Green parties held primaries, but no candidates declared and the contests saw only write-in votes.

General election
The general election took place on November 8, 2016. Garcia was the only candidate on the ballot and won reelection to a second term.

Results

References

Washington, D.C., Shadow Representative elections
2014 elections in Washington, D.C.